Sportsmanden ('The Sportsman') was a Norwegian weekly sports newspaper.

It was established in 1913 by Magnus Brænden, absorbed the competitor Idrætsliv in 1933, and went defunct in 1965. From 1914 to 1919 the paper was edited by Nanna With, a feminist. The other editors include Magnus Brænden and Charles Hoff.

References

1913 establishments in Norway
1965 disestablishments in Norway
Defunct newspapers published in Norway
Defunct weekly newspapers
Newspapers established in 1913
Norwegian-language newspapers
Publications disestablished in 1965
Sports mass media in Norway
Sports newspapers